Martha Ernstdóttir (born 22 December 1964) is an Icelandic long-distance runner. She competed in the women's marathon at the 2000 Summer Olympics.

Personal life
Martha is married to Jón Oddsson who was a member of both the Icelandic men's national football team and the Icelandic track and field national team. She is the aunt of middle-distance track athlete Aníta Hinriksdóttir.

References

External links
Profile at european-athletics.org

1964 births
Living people
Athletes (track and field) at the 2000 Summer Olympics
Martha Ernstdottir
Martha Ernstdottir
Martha Ernstdottir
Martha Ernstdottir
Martha Ernstdottir